Brompton and Rhiston was a civil parish in Shropshire, England. In 1987 it merged with Chirbury civil parish to form the present-day civil parish of Chirbury with Brompton. Brompton and Rhiston continues as a parish ward within the new civil parish, returning 2 councillors.

The parish included the settlements of Brompton and Pentreheyling, both hamlets. Rhiston is a small hamlet, partly in Wales; it was historically more notable and has an entry in the Domesday Book.

The neighbouring places of Brompton and Pentreheyling are notable for the fact that they are impossible to reach from any other place in England by road without first passing through Wales. Public footpaths are the only access which link them with the rest of England. They are however not geographically an exclave.

References

Former civil parishes in Shropshire
Extremities of Shropshire